Trojans is an extended play by Australian alternative rock band Atlas Genius. It was released as a 10" vinyl exclusively available in the United Kingdom on 25 February 2013. The vinyl is limited to 300 copies.

Track listing

Release history

References

2013 EPs
Atlas Genius EPs
Warner Records EPs